Scopula albidulata is a moth of the family Geometridae. It was described by Warren in 1897. It is found in south-eastern Brazil.

References

Moths described in 1897
albidulata
Endemic fauna of Brazil
Moths of South America
Taxa named by William Warren (entomologist)